För alltid is a 1995 album by Swedish dansband Arvingarna.

Track listing
Än finns det kärlek
Månsken över heden
Du och jag
Bo Diddley
Alltid
Åh, vilken tjej
Allt jag gör
Drömmen om Hollywood
En i mängden
Jag är ensam utan dej
Hon går hem till din bäste vän
Blåa känslor
California Girls
Natt efter natt
HD
Fri som en vind

Charts

References

1995 albums
Arvingarna albums